John Paul Alessio (born July 5, 1979) is a Canadian retired professional mixed martial artist. A former competitor in Bellator's Lightweight division. A professional competitor since 1998, Alessio has also formerly competed for the UFC where he was a former Welterweight title challenger, the WEC, PRIDE, King of the Cage, MFC and DREAM. Alessio is also the former King of the Cage Welterweight Champion and King of the Cage Superfight Champion.

Background
Alessio was born and raised Duncan, British Columbia, where he began training in Brazilian jiu-jitsu and kickboxing, before moving to San Jose, California at the age of 19 in order to pursue his dream of becoming a professional fighter. During his professional mixed martial arts career, Alessio has also won two national BMX trick biking championships.

Mixed martial arts career

Ultimate Fighting Championship
Alessio made his UFC debut at just 20 years old at UFC 26 on June 9, 2000, when he faced Pat Miletich. He lost the fight via armbar submission in the second round.

EliteXC
Alessio then signed a three-fight contract with EliteXC. However, he did not fight for the promotion before they ceased operations in October 2008.

Ultimate Glory
Alessio faced Sergey Golyaev at Ultimate Glory 12 on October 16, 2010. He won the fight in the second round via kimura.

Alessio then fought Siyar Bahadurzada in the United Glory welterweight semifinals on January 30, 2011, in Charleroi, Belgium and was beaten via TKO in the first round.

Return to UFC
On April 3, 2012, it was reported that Alessio has returned to the UFC to replace an injured Matt Wiman and face Mark Bocek at UFC 145. Alessio was defeated via unanimous decision (30-27, 29-28, 30-27).

Alessio then faced Shane Roller on July 7, 2012, at UFC 148. He lost the fight via unanimous decision.

Following his loss to Roller, Alessio was subsequently released from the UFC.

Aggression Fighting Championship
On September 13, Alessio signed with Aggression Fighting Championship. He headlined their AFC 13 show in Victoria, British Columbia on November 3. Alessio faced Dave Mazany in the main event. The bout ended in No Contest due to Mazany accidentally poking Alessio in the eye.

Bellator MMA
Alessio was scheduled to fight Tim Radcliffe at Global Warrior Challenge on June 29, 2013. However, he announced on Twitter on June 8 that a staph infection forced him to withdraw from the bout. Following that, Alessio announced that he had signed with Bellator MMA and will fight in the Lightweight tournament.

Alessio was originally scheduled to face Guillaume De Lorenzi at Bellator 119 on May 9, 2014. However, De Lorenzi was forced out of the bout due to injury, and Alessio instead fought Eric Wisely at the event. He won the fight via unanimous decision.

Alessio faced David Rickels at Bellator 139 on June 26, 2015. The fight was declared a no contest in the first round after Rickles landed an unintentional illegal knee rendering Alessio unable to continue.

Personal life
Alessio married Noelani Timas, an Import Tuner model known as Noelani Chase on June 9, 2010, in Las Vegas, Nevada. and he has one son prior to the relationship.

Championships and accomplishments
KOTC Welterweight Championship
KOTC Welterweight Championship (One time)
Tachi Palace Fights
TPF Welterweight Championship (One time)
United Glory
2010-2011 Welterweight Tournament Semi-Finalist
SuperBrawl
SuperBrawl 16 Middleweight Tournament Winner
Ultimate Fighting Championship
Youngest fighter to compete for a UFC Championship (20 years 11 months 4 days)

Mixed martial arts record

|-
| NC
| align=center| 35–17 (2)
| David Rickels
| NC (illegal knee)
| Bellator 139
| 
| align=center| 1
| align=center| 2:24
| Mulvane, Kansas, United States
|
|-
| Win
| align=center| 35–17 (1)
| Eric Wisely
| Decision (unanimous)
| Bellator 119
| 
| align=center| 3
| align=center| 5:00
| Rama, Ontario, Canada
|
|-
| Loss
| align=center| 34–17 (1)
| Will Brooks
| Decision (unanimous)
| Bellator 101
| 
| align=center| 3
| align=center| 5:00
| Portland, Oregon, United States
| 
|-
| NC
| align=center| 34–16 (1)
| Dave Mazany
| No Contest (eye poke)
| AFC 13: Natural Selection
| 
| align=center| 1
| align=center| N/A
| Victoria, British Columbia, Canada
| 
|-
| Loss
| align=center| 34–16
| Shane Roller
| Decision (unanimous)
| UFC 148
| 
| align=center| 3
| align=center| 5:00
| Las Vegas, Nevada, United States
| 
|-
| Loss
| align=center| 34–15
| Mark Bocek
| Decision (unanimous)
| UFC 145
| 
| align=center| 3
| align=center| 5:00
| Atlanta, Georgia, United States
| 
|-
| Win
| align=center| 34–14
| Ryan Healy
| Decision (unanimous)
| Score Fighting Series 4
| 
| align=center| 3
| align=center| 5:00
| Hamilton, Ontario, Canada
| 
|-
| Win
| align=center| 33–14
| Luiz Firmino
| Decision (unanimous)
| Superior Cage Combat 3
| 
| align=center| 3
| align=center| 5:00
| Las Vegas, Nevada, United States
| 
|-
| Win
| align=center| 32–14
| Shawn Fitzsimmons
| Submission (rear-naked choke)
| Superior Cage Combat 2
| 
| align=center| 2
| align=center| 3:52
| Las Vegas, Nevada, United States
| 
|-
| Loss
| align=center| 31–14
| Siyar Bahadurzada
| TKO (punches)
| United Glory 13
| 
| align=center| 1
| align=center| 1:55
| Charleroi, Belgium
| 
|-
|  Win
| align=center| 31–13
| Phil Collins
| TKO (punches)
| TPF 7: Deck the Halls
| 
| align=center| 3
| align=center| 0:35
| Lemoore, California, United States
| 
|-
|  Win
| align=center| 30–13
| Sergey Golyaev
| Submission (kimura)
| United Glory 12
| 
| align=center| 2
| align=center| 2:51
| Amsterdam, Netherlands
| 
|-
|  Win
| align=center| 29–13
| War Machine
| Submission (rear-naked choke)
| TPF 5: Stars and Strikes
| 
| align=center| 3
| align=center| 2:24
| Lemoore, California, United States
| 
|-
|  Win
| align=center| 28–13
| Chris Clements
| Submission (guillotine choke)
| W-1 MMA 4: Bad Blood
| 
| align=center| 1
| align=center| 4:24
| Montreal, Quebec, Canada
| 
|-
|  Win
| align=center| 27–13
| Matt Delanoit
| Submission (rear-naked choke)
| ROF 37: Warlords
| 
| align=center| 1
| align=center| 2:46
| Omaha, Nebraska, United States
| 
|-
|  Win
| align=center| 26–13
| Luigi Fioravanti
| KO (punches)
| MFC 22
| 
| align=center| 3
| align=center| 1:34
| Edmonton, Alberta, Canada
| 
|-
|  Win
| align=center| 25–13
| Andrew Buckland
| Submission (rear-naked choke)
| MFC 21
| 
| align=center| 1
| align=center| 2:53
| Enoch, Alberta, Canada
| 
|-
|  Loss
| align=center| 24–13
| André Galvão
| Submission (armbar)
| Dream 8
| 
| align=center| 1
| align=center| 7:34
| Nagoya, Japan
| 
|-
|  Loss
| align=center| 24–12
| Paul Daley
| KO (punches)
| MFC 19: Long Time Coming
| 
| align=center| 2
| align=center| 2:18
| Enoch, Alberta, Canada
| 
|-
|  Win
| align=center| 24–11
| Gideon Ray
| TKO (punches)
| SuperFights MMA: Night of Combat 2
| 
| align=center| 1
| align=center| 0:45
| Las Vegas, Nevada, United States
| 
|-
|  Win
| align=center| 23–11
| Pete Spratt
| Submission (rear-naked choke)
| Banner Promotions: Night of Combat
| 
| align=center| 2
| align=center| 2:07
| Las Vegas, Nevada, United States
| 
|-
| Loss
| align=center| 22–11
| Brock Larson
| DQ (knee to downed fighter)
| WEC 33: Marshall vs. Stann
| 
| align=center| 1
| align=center| 1:50
| Paradise, Nevada, United States
| 
|-
| Win
| align=center| 22–10
| Todd Moore
| Decision (unanimous)
| WEC 31
| 
| align=center| 3
| align=center| 5:00
| Paradise, Nevada, United States
| 
|-
| Win
| align=center| 21–10
| Marcelo Brito
| Decision (unanimous)
| WEC 30
| 
| align=center| 3
| align=center| 5:00
| Las Vegas, Nevada, United States
| 
|-
| Win
| align=center| 20–10
| Alex Serdyukov
| Submission (guillotine choke)
| WEC 28
| 
| align=center| 1
| align=center| 1:17
| Las Vegas, Nevada, United States
| 
|-
| Loss
| align=center| 19–10
| Carlos Condit
| Submission (rear-naked choke)
| WEC 26: Condit vs. Alessio
| 
| align=center| 2
| align=center| 4:59
| Las Vegas, Nevada, United States
| 
|-
| Win
| align=center| 19–9
| Brian Gassaway
| Submission (rear-naked choke)
| WEC 25
| 
| align=center| 1
| align=center| 4:50
| Las Vegas, Nevada, United States
| 
|-
| Loss
| align=center| 18–9
| Thiago Alves
| Decision (unanimous)
| Ortiz vs. Shamrock 3: The Final Chapter
| 
| align=center| 3
| align=center| 5:00
| Hollywood, Florida, United States
| 
|-
| Win
| align=center| 18–8
| Alex Serdyukov
| Submission (rear-naked choke)
| WEC 23: Hot August Fights
| 
| align=center| 3
| align=center| 1:52
| Lemoore, California, United States
| 
|-
| Loss
| align=center| 17–8
| Diego Sanchez
| Decision (unanimous)
| UFC 60: Hughes vs. Gracie
| 
| align=center| 3
| align=center| 5:00
| Los Angeles, California, United States
| 
|-
| Win
| align=center| 17–7
| Savant Young
| Submission (rear-naked choke)
| KOTC: Shock and Awe
| 
| align=center| 3
| align=center| 2:09
| Edmonton, Alberta, Canada
| 
|-
| Win
| align=center| 16–7
| Shannon Ritch
| TKO (punches)
| KOTC 58: Prime Time
| 
| align=center| 1
| align=center| 0:41
| San Jacinto, California, United States
| 
|-
| Loss
| align=center| 15–7
| Jonathan Goulet
| Decision (split)
| TKO 18: Impact
| 
| align=center| 3
| align=center| 5:00
| Montreal, Quebec, Canada
| 
|-
| Win
| align=center| 15–6
| Brandon Olsen
| Submission (armbar)
| ETB: Enter the Beast
| 
| align=center| 1
| align=center| 2:59
| Nanaimo, British Columbia, Canada
| 
|-
| Win
| align=center| 14–6
| Ronald Jhun
| Decision (unanimous)
| KOTC 29: Renegades
| 
| align=center| 3
| align=center| 5:00
| San Jacinto, California, United States
| 
|-
| Loss
| align=center| 13–6
| Jason Black
| Decision (split)
| UCC 12: Adrenaline
| 
| align=center| 3
| align=center| 5:00
| Montreal, Quebec, Canada
| 
|-
| Win
| align=center| 13–5
| Eiji Mitsuoka
| TKO (doctor stoppage)
| PRIDE The Best Vol.2
| 
| align=center| 2
| align=center| 3:13
| Tokyo, Japan
| 
|-
| Win
| align=center| 12–5
| Chris Brennan
| TKO (punches)
| KOTC 15: Bad Intentions
| 
| align=center| 1
| align=center| 2:20
| San Jacinto, California, United States
| 
|-
| Win
| align=center| 11–5
| John Delao
| TKO (punches)
| World Freestyle Fighting 1
| 
| align=center| 1
| align=center| 1:22
| Kelowna, British Columbia, Canada
| 
|-
| Win
| align=center| 10–5
| Nassor Lewis
| Submission (rear-naked choke)
| KOTC 12: Cold Blood
| 
| align=center| 1
| align=center| 2:07
| San Jacinto, California, United States
| 
|-
| Win
| align=center| 9–5
| Sean Pierson
| KO (head kick)
| UCC 7: Bad Boyz
| 
| align=center| 2
| align=center| 1:14
| Montreal, Quebec, Canada
| 
|-
| Win
| align=center| 8–5
| Thomas Denny
| Submission (keylock)
| KOTC 11: Domination
| 
| align=center| 1
| align=center| 1:55
| San Jacinto, California, United States
| 
|-
| Loss
| align=center| 7–5
| Joe Doerksen
| Submission (rear-naked choke)
| Superbrawl: Futurebrawl 2000
| 
| align=center| 2
| align=center| 3:48
| Honolulu, Hawaii, United States
| 
|-
| Loss
| align=center| 7–4
| Pat Miletich
| Submission (armbar)
| UFC 26
| 
| align=center| 2
| align=center| 1:43
| Cedar Rapids, Iowa, United States
| 
|-
| Win
| align=center| 7–3
| Jay R. Palmer
| Submission (rear-naked choke)
| SuperBrawl 16
| 
| align=center| 1
| align=center| 1:20
| Honolulu, Hawaii, United States
| 
|-
| Win
| align=center| 6–3
| John Chrisostomo
| TKO (punches)
| SuperBrawl 16
| 
| align=center| 2
| align=center| 3:04
| Honolulu, Hawaii, United States
| 
|-
| Loss
| align=center| 5–3
| Egan Inoue
| Submission (rear-naked choke)
| SuperBrawl 15
| 
| align=center| 1
| align=center| 2:41
| Honolulu, Hawaii, United States
| 
|-
| Win
| align=center| 5–2
| Jason Meaders
| Decision (unanimous)
| Neutral Grounds 13
| 
| align=center| 3
| align=center| 5:00
| Lakeside, California, United States
| 
|-
| Loss
| align=center| 4–2
| Kousei Kubota
| Submission (kimura)
| Pancrase: Breakthrough 9
| 
| align=center| 1
| align=center| 10:53
| Tokyo, Japan
| 
|-
| Win
| align=center| 4–1
| Fritz Borchardt
| TKO (strikes)
| Extreme Challenge 28
| 
| align=center| 1
| align=center| 2:12
| Ogden, Utah, United States
| 
|-
| Win
| align=center| 3–1
| Ben Earwood
| Decision (split)
| Extreme Challenge 28
| 
| align=center| 1
| align=center| 13:00
| Ogden, Utah, United States
| 
|-
| Loss
| align=center| 2–1
| David Harris
| Submission (rear-naked choke)
| Bas Rutten Invitational 2
| 
| align=center| 1
| align=center| 8:32
| Littleton, Colorado, United States
| 
|-
| Win
| align=center| 2–0
| Derek McClinton
| Submission (heel hook)
| Ultimate Battle
| 
| align=center| 1
| align=center| 1:44
| Victoria, British Columbia, Canada
| 
|-
| Win
| align=center| 1–0
| Mike Headley
| Submission (arm-triangle choke)
| Ultimate Battle
| 
| align=center| 1
| align=center| 5:28
| Victoria, British Columbia, Canada
|

See also
List of Bellator MMA alumni
List of Canadian UFC fighters
List of male mixed martial artists

References

External links
Official Website

Canadian male mixed martial artists
Welterweight mixed martial artists
Mixed martial artists utilizing kickboxing
Mixed martial artists utilizing Brazilian jiu-jitsu
Sportspeople from Vancouver
1979 births
Living people
Ultimate Fighting Championship male fighters
Canadian practitioners of Brazilian jiu-jitsu